Langa Education Assistance Program (LEAP), also known as LEAP Science and Mathematics Schools, is a collection of six non-fee payment secondary education schools located in three provinces in South Africa. The first LEAP school opened in 2004 in rented premises in Observatory, Cape Town and mainly served the township of Langa. LEAP is an independent school mainly founded by South African Corporates with limited subsidies from the Department of Basic Education.

History

Langa Education Assistance Program (or LEAP) 

John Gilmour was a teacher at Pinelands High School in Cape Town in 1987 when he decided to respond to a call from the South African business community, to contribute to the redress of the devastation of the Bantu Education Act, a segregation law imposed in the education sector by the Apartheid system in 1953.

“Africa Week" was then introduced by a team led by John Gilmour to bring black learners under the "Bantu Education" system to spend a week at Pinelands High School, which was then a whites-only school. The program became the precursor for the Langa Education Assistance Program (or LEAP) which aimed at providing one hundred black students from the Langa township with support tuition from Pinelands High teachers in English, Mathematics and Science three afternoons a week.

The prohibitive transport cost of bringing learners from the township schools to Pinelands High School forced the model to be revised. In 1996, it was then decided that instead of learners being bussed in to Pinelands High, teachers will be transported to meet learners in township schools.

Community members in Langa perceived the new model of LEAP as an attempt of white teachers to "save" black children. Teachers from the community felt that they were as able as other teachers to provide extra lessons that would address the inadequacies in the students' educational foundations. The uneasiness within the community obliged the leadership of LEAP to change the model and include community teachers in the program.

When John Gilmour realised that there was no increase in the proportion of black learners entering university, especially science-based disciplines, he sought for an alternative model. LEAP Science and Maths school was the alternative model.

LEAP Science and Maths School

LEAP Science and Maths school aims to increase the number of black learners who take science and maths-based modules at high school to increase the chance of being accepted at university, particularly in disciplines where these modules are a prerequisite.

Gilmour resigned as headmaster of Abbot's College in 2004, where he had been since he left Pinelands in 1997, to focus on LEAP Science and Maths School. In January 2004, the first LEAP Science and Maths School opened its doors in the suburb of Observatory, Cape Town, with seventy-two learners, seven teachers and one administrative staff member.

Expansion of the LEAP model

LEAP 1

The LEAP Science and Maths School, which started in Observatory, later moved to Pinelands and become known as LEAP 1. It is now located in Langa itself, in the St Francis Centre. It serves Langa Township. It is the first and oldest of the LEAP Science and Maths schools. The school is headed by its operation leader Lindelwa Mini, an alumnus of LEAP.

LEAP 2

LEAP 2 opened in 2007 in Pinelands. It serves learners from the townships of Gugulethu, Delft, Philippi, and Crossroads. In 2013, the school opened satellite classes to serve grade 9 and 10 learners from the township of Delft. Learners of the school are taught in English and isiXhosa. The head of the school is Waleed Isaacs, who also assumes the role of operations leader.

LEAP 3

The school opened in 2008 to serve learners from the township of Alexandra in Johannesburg. Learners are taught in English, isiZulu, Sepedi and Sesotho under the operations leader, Asanda Sigigaba, alumnus of LEAP.

LEAP 4

This school is situated in the township of Diepsloot just outside Johannesburg. The school opened in 2011 through a partnership with the South Africa corporate Aveng Group. LEAP 4 teaches learners in isiZulu and Sepedi as home languages, along with English. Joame Malope, alumnus of LEAP, is the operations leader and head of LEAP 4.

LEAP 5

In 2012, LEAP 5 opened its doors in Jane Furse, Sekhukhune in Limpopo province. The school is under the leadership of its operations leader, Raphael Mukachi.

LEAP 6

LEAP 6 is situated in Ga-Rankuwa near Pretoria. The school opened in 2012 to respond to the request of the Anglican Diocese of Pretoria, concerned with the community's poor educational results and high unemployment rate among young people. The school is led by its operations leader, Wilhemina Motileng.

Focus

LEAP schools focus on maths and science and emphasises on the emotional development of learners. John Gilmour acknowledged the importance of the emotional development in a country where "eight million children come from single-parent households and a further 4.3 million reside with neither biological parent".

Success stories

Statistics

In a report that analyses the performance of the school between 2005 and 2013, LEAP reported that:

Its grade 12 learners achieved a 93% pass rate within the reporting period.
600 learners passed the National Senior Certificate (NSC) examinations commonly known as “matric”
77% qualified for study at academic and technical universities with a bachelor or diploma pass.

The school claims to outperform national statistics when it compares itself with national averages of learners who write maths and science in 2013. All LEAP learners wrote these modules compared to only 43% who took maths and 33% who took physical science nationally.

Graduates

Bonisanani Mtshekisa is LEAP's first university graduate. He graduated with a Bachelor of Commerce in Finance from the University of the Western Cape. In its 2012 annual report, the school reported to have over 30 university graduates including physiotherapists, engineers, and accountants.

Celebratory adverts

In 2014, LEAP launched a series of celebratory adverts to celebrate the achievements of its past students. Qondisa Nxganga, a Master's graduate from the African Institute for Mathematical Sciences (AIMS), is featured in these adverts alongside other LEAP alumni.

Partnerships

LEAP's model is based on engagement with the broader community and building partnerships and collaboration with other organisations, particularly schools. It is a three-way collaboration approach where each LEAP school partners with a more privileged school as well as a less privileged school (a township school) in the community where it operates to promote a culture of shared resources and cultural exchange.

LEAP has also built partnerships with both commercial and non-profit organisations. Most of its funding comes from South African corporates, trusts and foundations.

LEAP is "Teach with Africa's" partner on the continent and together they have established the Teacher Institute which seeks to develop teachers and supports individuals wanting to enter the teaching profession

References

External links

http://www.educationinnovations.org/program/leap-science-and-maths-schools
http://dogreatthings.co.za/foundation/education/leap-science-and-maths-school/
http://www.givengain.com/cause/3841/

1987 establishments in South Africa
Educational institutions established in 1987
Educational organisations based in South Africa
Schools of mathematics
Science education